Alexandro Felix Kamuru (born 19 August 2005) is an Indonesian footballer currently playing as a left-back for Barito Putera.

Club career

Early life
Born in Sorong, Southwest Papua, both of Kamuru's parents died when he was young; his father dying before he was born in April 2005, and his mother in 2018. He was raised by his older brother.

He started playing football at the age of nine, joining local side SSB Gama Yogyakarta. In 2018 he left SSB Gama and joined professional side Barito Putera.

International career
Kamuru has represented Indonesia at under-15 and under-16 level.

References

2005 births
Living people
People from Sorong
Indonesian footballers
Indonesia youth international footballers
Association football defenders
PS Barito Putera players